Oxidae is a family of prostigs in the order Trombidiformes. There are at least 4 genera and about 15 described species in Oxidae.

Genera
 Flabellifrontipoda
 Frontipoda Koenike, 1891
 Gnaphiscus Koenike, 1898
 Oxus Kramer, 1877

References

Further reading

 
 
 
 

Trombidiformes
Acari families